Refugee is the only studio album from the progressive rock band Refugee, released in March 1974 on Charisma Records. It was re-released under the TimeWave label on 27 June 2006, and as an expanded three-disc boxed set from Esoteric Recordings in 2019.

Background and recording
The opening song "Papillon" (French for "butterfly") had no title when it was written, or even when it was recorded. While listening to the finished mix, the band members decided that the opening Moog flurry sounded like butterfly wings, and named the song after the recently released film Papillon.

"Someday" was written about the breakup of bassist/lead vocalist/guitarist Lee Jackson's marriage.

Keyboardist Patrick Moraz came up with the idea of writing a song about the Grand Canyon and asked Jackson to write lyrics for it. Jackson took books and maps out of the library to research and get inspiration for the lyrics.

The title of the track "Ritt Mickley" originated from Moraz's strong French Swiss accent, when he asked the other band members to play the song again but more "rhythmically".

Track listing
All songs written by Lee Jackson and Patrick Moraz, except where noted.
"Papillion" (Moraz) – 5:10
"Someday" – 5:03
"Grand Canyon Suite" – 16:54
"The Source" – 2:23
"Theme for the Canyon" – 3:16
"The Journey" – 3:54
"The Rapids" – 2:53
"The Mighty Colorado" – 4:30
"Gatecrasher" – 1:03
"Ritt Mickley" (Moraz) - 5:57
"Credo" - 18:08
"Prelude" - 3:41
"I Believe, Pt. 1" - 2:48
"Credo Theme" - 0:39
"Credo Toccata & Song (The Lost Cause)" (Jackson, Moraz, Jean Ristori) - 3:37
"Agitato" - 1:36
"I Believe, Pt. 2" - 1:10
"Variation" - 2:57
"Main Theme & Finale" - 1:36

Esoteric Recordings expanded edition
Disc two - BBC Radio One in Concert
Ritt Mickley (Moraz)
Someday
Grand Canyon Suite

Disc three - Live at Newcastle City Hall
Ritt Mickley (outro) (Moraz)
One Left Handed Peter Pan
The Diamond Hard Blue Apples of the Moon (Keith Emerson, Jackson)
Someday
Papillon (Moraz)
She Belongs to Me (Bob Dylan)
The Grand Canyon Suite
Refugee Jam (Moraz, Jackson, Brian Davison)

Personnel
Refugee
Patrick Moraz - mini-moog, AKS synthesiser, piano, electric piano, clavinet, organ, pipe organ, marimbaphone, alpine horn, electronic slinky, mellotron, occasional vocals
Lee Jackson - bass, electric cello, guitar, 12-string acoustic guitar, lead vocals
Brian Davison - drums, tympani, gongs, Tibetan temple bells, African drums, kabassa, broken glass

Production
Arranged: Refugee
Produced: John Burns and Refugee
Engineered and mixed: Patrick Moraz

External links
 Discogs Entry

Notes

1974 debut albums
Charisma Records albums